Pyraclostrobin is a quinone outside inhibitor (QI)-type fungicide used in agriculture. Among the QIs, it lies within the strobilurin chemical class.

Use
Pyraclostrobin is used to protect Fragaria, Rubus idaeus, Vaccinium corymbosum, Ribes rubrum, Ribes uva-crispa, blackberry (various Rubus spp.), and Pistachio vera.

Target pathogens
Pyraclostrobin is used against Botrytis cinerea and Alternaria alternata.

Resistance
Resistant populations have been identified in:
Botrytis cinerea on Fragaria in the Carolinas, conferred by the G143A mutation in the partial cytochrome b (CYTB) gene.
Botrytis cinerea on Fragaria, Rubus idaeus, Vaccinium corymbosum, Ribes rubrum, Ribes uva-crispa, and blackberry (various Rubus spp.) in Northern Germany.
Botrytis cinerea on Fragaria in Florida.
Alternaria alternata on Pistachio vera in California.

Geography of use

United States
Pyraclostrobin was widely used throughout the United States , but especially in the Upper Midwest.

Off-target toxicity
Although toxic, and recommended to be avoided by humans, pyraclostrobin is of temporary and low toxicity, that is to say it is merely an irritant of eyes and skin. It does cause some degree of reproductive and developmental failure in mammals but does not absorb well through the skin. It is likely to bioaccumulate in aquatic organisms.

Residues in diet
Pyraclostrobin does not accumulate in foods to a significant degree.

Biodegradability
Pyraclostrobin is described by one source as not very biodegradable, and by another as possibly significantly biodegradable.

References

Further reading

Fungicides
Carbamates
Pyrazoles
Anilines
Chloroarenes
Strobilurins